La Paz is a district in the Itapúa Department of Paraguay.

References 

Districts of Itapúa Department